Gurudwara Sangat Tola is a Sikh temple in Dhaka, the capital of Bangladesh. It's located at no.14 Sishdas lane, Bangla Bazar in Dhaka.

History
Ninth Sikh guru, Tyag Bahadur come to Dhaka from Assam in the 17th century stay there from 1666AD-1668AD. He built Gurudwara Sangat Tola in Bangla Bazar during his stay.

Architecture
It is estimated that the oldest building of the Sangat Tola no longer exists. Currently it's a two-storied building and it has round balcony that is visible from the outside. Signs of disk and sword are painted on the wall. Besides the stairs, a broken part of a wide wall can be found which indicates that there used to be one or more rooms in that area of the building. On the second floor, there's a prayer room for Sikhs. The holy book of Sikhs is kept in the prayer room. Also pictures of Tyag Bahadur is preserved here.

Current State
The temple of more than 350 years is now abandoned. Some people obtained some part of it illegally. The cover on the walls of the office room on the ground floor is no longer functional. The walls to the right of the stairs is broken since many days. This old building is not listed in the list of archaeological finds or in any other preservation list.

Management And Activities
Volunteers of Gurdwara Nanak Shahi look after this Sangat Tola. Every morning a gronthy (a person who says preyer) says preyer. Also every Saturday a Kirtan (song to praise god or maybe religion) is held. Five Gurudwaras in Bangladesh including Gurudwara Sangat Tola is administrated by Gurudwara Management Committee Bangladesh (IGD) with coordinated help from a service organization in Punjab, India called Sampardai Kar Seba. A religious organization of Sikhism in India, "Karseba Sarhali" provides fund to run Gurudwaras.

See also
Sikhism
Sikhism in India
Sikhism in Pakistan
Sikhism in Afghanistan
Sikhism in the United States
Sikhism in the United Kingdom
Sikhism in Canada

References

Gurdwaras in Bangladesh
17th-century gurdwaras
Religious buildings and structures in Dhaka